The scouting and Girl Guides movement in Togo is served by:
 Association des Guides du Togo, member of the World Association of Girl Guides and Girl Scouts
 Association Scoute du Togo, member of the World Organization of the Scout Movement

See also

 
Youth movements